This is a list of organizations with  domain names, in alphabetical order of the second-level domain name. , the  domain file contains 168 second-level domain designations, but this list is not comprehensive.

Organizations in the  domain are generally international organizations established by treaty.  However, some (such as the YMCA) do not meet current restrictions and were grandfathered in from prior acceptance.

List of organizations

Table annotations

References

Internet Assigned Numbers Authority
Intergovernmental organizations
Lists of organizations
Domain name lists